Earswick station (before 1874, known as Huntington station) was a station on the York to Beverley Line north east of the City of York, England.

History
Huntington station opened on 4 October 1847 and served the villages of Huntington and New Earswick.

The station was renamed Earswick station on 1 November 1874. It closed on 27 November 1965.

The station and platforms were demolished in 1970–1 and The Hogshead (formerly Flag and Whistle) pub now occupies the site where the station once stood.

References

Sources

 
 

Disused railway stations in North Yorkshire
Former York and North Midland Railway stations
Railway stations in Great Britain opened in 1847
Railway stations in Great Britain closed in 1965
Beeching closures in England
1847 establishments in England
George Townsend Andrews railway stations